Teodor Demetriad (born 30 January 1978) is a Romanian bobsledder. He competed in the four man event at the 2002 Winter Olympics.

References

1978 births
Living people
Romanian male bobsledders
Olympic bobsledders of Romania
Bobsledders at the 2002 Winter Olympics
Sportspeople from Bucharest